Graham Foster (born 1967) is an Australian former professional rugby league footballer who played in the 1980s. He played for the Manly Warringah Sea Eagles in 1986 and the Newcastle Knights in 1988.

References

External links
http://www.rugbyleagueproject.org/players/Graham_Foster/summary.html

Australian rugby league players
Manly Warringah Sea Eagles players
Newcastle Knights players
Living people
1967 births